Methylfluorophosphonylcholine (MFPCh) is an extremely toxic chemical compound related to the G-series nerve agents. It is an extremely potent acetylcholinesterase inhibitor which is around 100 times more potent than sarin at inhibiting acetylcholinesterase in vitro, and around 10 times more potent in vivo, depending on route of administration and animal species tested. MFPCh is resistant to oxime reactivators, meaning the acetylcholinesterase inhibited by MFPCh can't be reactivated by oxime reactivators. MFPCh also acts directly on the acetylcholine receptors. However, despite its high toxicity, methylfluorophosphonylcholine is a relatively unstable compound and degrades rapidly in storage, so it was not deemed suitable to be weaponised for military use.

See also
GV (nerve agent)
Sarin
TMTFA

References

Acetylcholinesterase inhibitors
Methylphosphonofluoridates
Choline esters